Jacqueline Thome-Patenôtre (February 3, 1906 – June 2, 1995) was a French politician. She served as a member of the National Assembly from 1958 to 1973, representing first Seine-et-Oise and later Yvelines.

References

1906 births
1995 deaths
Politicians from Paris
Radical Party (France) politicians
Radical Party of the Left politicians
French Senators of the Fourth Republic
Senators of Seine-et-Oise
Deputies of the 1st National Assembly of the French Fifth Republic
Deputies of the 2nd National Assembly of the French Fifth Republic
Deputies of the 3rd National Assembly of the French Fifth Republic
Deputies of the 4th National Assembly of the French Fifth Republic
Deputies of the 5th National Assembly of the French Fifth Republic
Women members of the National Assembly (France)
20th-century French women politicians
Women members of the Senate (France)